This is a list of all the stratigraphic units that are found in the Netherlands.

References